The House of Dancing Water was a water-based stage production written and directed by Franco Dragone. The show, which was the second water show by Franco Dragone's company, premiered in September 2010. , it had been performed over 3,800 times and seen by over 2 million spectators. The production was located at the City of Dreams resort in Cotai, Macau. The show ran for 90 minutes, and featured acrobatic elements and original acts, with a stage that transformed into different sets.  Over 90 gymnasts, circus artists, dancers, divers, actors, and motorcyclists were featured in the show. The performers worked alongside 160 production staff, technicians and professional scuba divers from around the world.  

In 2019, the production was purchased entirely by Melco Resorts from Franco Dragone Entertainment Group. Due to Covid-19, performances were drastically cut in the beginning of 2020, and by June, all were postponed to allow the creation of an updated production - set to open in 2021. However, due to limitations on border and immigration movement imposed by the Macau government, the production was not able to enter their re-creation phase. This caused the casino to permanently terminate almost all of the shows artists and production team in December 2020. Currently, the theatre is still planned to re-open with a refreshed production, with a timeframe currently unknown.

Creation
The show was developed at Dragone's headquarters in La Louvière, Belgium. Performers began training in January 2009. The total duration of the show's creation was 19 months, due to delays in the construction of the 2,000-seat Dancing Water theatre, which was built over 5 years at a cost of US$250 million.

At the center of the theatre is a 3.7 million-gallon pool (14000 m³). Eleven automated stage lifts that fit neatly together can be raised a meter above the water's surface or dropped seven meters below it, creating a pool deep enough for a diver to leap from a 24-meter-high platform.

Cast
About 70% of the artists in this show are trained to perform almost all of the acts in the show.  Each performer must pass an intense swim test, along with weeks of training to obtain their scuba certification for aquatic shows.

The House of Dancing Water's cast comprises several different categories of performer. They include:
Motorbike performers.
House troupe (male and female - mostly gymnasts and sports acrobats)
Acrobatic dancers (male - mostly men who have a gymnastics and dance background)
Dancers (female)
Characters (actors, clowns)
Pyramid (group from Tanzania)

Music
The show's score was composed by Benoît Jutras. Franco Dragone and Benoît Jutras had previously worked together on several shows for Cirque du Soleil. The show's soundtrack album was released on June 10, 2011.

 Dancing Water
 Opening and theme throughout the show
 Chandelier
 The Human Chandelier
  Pyramid
 The Human Pyramid  Act
 Swans
 Pagode
 Bungees
 Flags
 Fountain Dance
 Prisoners
 Straps
 Journey
 Bamboo Dance
 Boat
 Xia
 Transition into Russian Swing
 Motos
 Motorcycle Act
 Wabo
 Earthquake Scene
 War
 The Crowning
 In Joy
 Finale and High Dive

The music used during the Russian Swing act, which changed during the first months of the show's run, is not on the soundtrack album.

References

Tourist attractions in Macau
2010 establishments in Macau